Narope is a genus of Neotropical butterflies in family Nymphalidae, and includes species that present inconspicuously marking patterns on the wings. The genus includes 16 species.

Species
Narope albopunctum (Stichel, 1904)
Narope anartes (Hewitson, 1874)
Narope cauca (Casagrande, 2002)
Narope cyllabarus (Westwood, 1851)
Narope cyllarus (Westwood, 1851)
Narope cyllastros (Doubleday, 1849)
Narope cyllene (C & R Felder, 1859)
Narope dentimaculatus (Talbot, 1928)
Narope guilhermei (Casagrande, 1989)
Narope marmorata (Schaus, 1902)
Narope minor (Casagrande, 2002)
Narope nesope (Hewitson, 1869)
Narope obidos (Casagrande, 2002)
Narope panniculus (Stichel, 1904)
Narope syllabus (Staudinger, 1887)
Narope testacea (Godman & Salvin, 1878)
Narope ybyra (Casagrande, 2002)

References

Morphinae
Nymphalidae of South America
Nymphalidae genera
Taxa named by Henry Doubleday